Middleton's Plantation, also known as Chisolm's Plantation and The Launch, is a historic plantation house located near Edisto Island, Charleston County, South Carolina. It was built about 1830, and is a two-story wooden house, with one-room wings.  It sits on a raised arcaded brick basement.  It features a small Tuscan order colonnaded porch on the land side facade and a recessed, full width, Tuscan order colonnaded porch on the water side. It was the home of Oliver Hering Middleton, son of Governor Henry Middleton of Middleton Place.

It was listed on the National Register of Historic Places in 1971.

References

Plantation houses in South Carolina
Houses on the National Register of Historic Places in South Carolina
Houses completed in 1830
Houses in Charleston County, South Carolina
National Register of Historic Places in Charleston County, South Carolina
1830 establishments in South Carolina